Charith Jayampathi (born 1 February 1991) is a Sri Lankan first-class cricketer who plays for Tamil Union Cricket and Athletic Club.

References

External links
 

1991 births
Living people
Sri Lankan cricketers
Tamil Union Cricket and Athletic Club cricketers
Southern Express cricketers
Uva Next cricketers